Contraflow can refer to:

 contraflow lane, a transportation engineering technique of creating a single traffic lane that flows in the direction opposite of the surrounding lanes
 contraflow lane reversal, the practice of creating, temporarily or permanently, a contraflow lane
 Counter-flows (also called contraflow), the flow of culture counter to the normal dominant-to-dominated cultural adaptation patterns